Alastair John Bellingham  (27 March 1938 –4 December 2017) was a British haematologist.

Early life and education
Bellingham was born to Stanley Herbert Bellingham and Sybil Mary Milne.
He was a graduate of Tiffin Boys' School and University College London Hospital Medical School.

Career
Bellingham did research on red cell abnormalities including sickle-cell disease.
From 1974 to 1984 he was at the Department of Haematology, University of Liverpool. 
Bellingham was also a professor at King's College London, 1984–1997.

Personal life 
He was married to Valerie Jill (Morford) Bellingham (m. 1963–1997, her death) and, secondly, to Julia Bellingham.

Death 
Bellingham died on 4 December 2017, aged 79.

Honors and awards 
 President of the British Society for Haematology (1992–1993)
 President of the Royal College of Pathologists (1993–1996)
 Chairman of the National Health Service Information Authority (1999–at least 2004)
 CBE
 FRCP
 FRCPE
 FRCPGlas
 FRCPath

References 

1938 births
2017 deaths
People educated at Tiffin School
Alumni of the UCL Medical School
British pathologists
British haematologists
Academics of the University of Liverpool
Academics of King's College London
Commanders of the Order of the British Empire
Fellows of the Royal College of Physicians
Fellows of the Royal College of Physicians of Edinburgh
Fellows of the Royal College of Physicians and Surgeons of Glasgow